Bijar is a village and one of the 51 Union Councils (administrative subdivisions) of Khushab District in the Punjab Province of Pakistan. It is located on a very important junction from where the roads lead to all four directions. Mitha Tiwana is located on its east, Sheikhu is on west, Panja is on its south and Bijar stop (former Nawab de Kothi) National Highway (Mianwali-Sargodha Road) is on north side.

It is one of the very important Union Council of Khushab District. It is divided into two parts. Janoobi Bijar consists of the Village and Shumali Bijar is  Derajats of the people of Bijar who are living permanently at their cultivation area

Location
 It is located at 32°15'24N 72°3'15

References

Union councils of Khushab District
Populated places in Khushab District